Now or Never (stylized as NOW OR NEVER) is the sixth studio album by Japanese hip-hop group Lead. It was their first album to chart in the top ten on the Oricon charts since their debut album Life On Da Beat (2003) coming in at #6 and remaining on the charts for two weeks.

The album was their first album in four years and contained four preluding singles: GiraGira Romantic, Speed Star★, Hurricane and Wanna Be With You. Both Hurricane and Wanna Be With You charted in the top ten, with Wanna Be With You charting at #3. It was their first album to be released in multiple editions: CD, CD+DVD and two 2CD editions with different content.

Now or Never was their last album with lead vocalist Hiroki Nakadoi, whereas, after their following single Still, he left the group due to feelings of inadequacy.

Information
Now or Never is the sixth studio album, seventh overall, by Japanese hip-hop group Lead, released on July 18, 2012 under the Pony Canyon label. The album charted high on the Oricon Albums Charts, taking the #6 spot and remaining on the charts for two consecutive weeks. The album charted better than their last studio album, Feel The Vibes, which had only peaked at #44.

Prior to the album's release, there were four preluding singles over the course of three years, beginning with GiraGira Romantic on August 5, 2009. GiraGira Romantic was released a year after their last single Sunnyday and album Lead Tracks ~listener's choice~. "Gira gira" is a Japanese sound effect, which typically denotes something shiny or sparkling. The single GiraGira Romantic would also be the first time Lead would release different editions of their singles, outside of the standard CD and CD+DVD combo.

Their following single, Speed Star (stylized as SPEED STAR★), would carry an updated version of their song "Virgin Blue," which was originally released in March 2006. This version would be placed on the second disc of the Type B edition of the album. The following singles, Hurricane (stylized as HURRICANE) and Wanna Be With You, both charted in the top ten on the Oricon Singles Charts at #8 and #3 respectively. Some of the coupling tracks from the singles would be placed on the Type C editions of the album.

The album became their first album to be released with multiple editions, a standard CD, a CD+DVD combo and two different 2CD versions, the latter three of which were of limited release. Each edition contained different content. The 2CD Jacket B edition contained both the studio album on the first disc, while the second disc harbored a compilation of all their previous a-sides, some of which were updated for their tenth anniversary release. The 2CD Jacket C edition contained both the studio album on the first disc and a collection of the groups best coupling tracks from past singles, some of which were rearranged for the album. The new song "Burning Up!" was also included on the second disc. For the CD+DVD edition, the music video for "Stand and Fight" was included, which was the main promotional track for Now or Never.

Now or Never would become Lead's final album with lead vocalist Hiroki Nakadoi, whereas Hiroki resigned due to feeling inadequate compared to his fellow members. After the group celebrated their tenth anniversary with the Leader's Party 10! concert for their fan club in March 2013, vocalist Hiroki Nakadoi stepped away from the group. His final single release with Lead would be with their single Still, which had been released on December 12, 2012 - his departure would come the following year in April.

Hiroki's departure

After Lead celebrated their tenth anniversary with the Leader's Party 10! concert for their fan club in March 2013, vocalist Hiroki Nakadoi stepped away from the group. His final single release with Lead was for their single Still, which had been released on December 12, 2012, and his departure was in April the following year.

Hiroki began to discuss his feelings about leaving to the other members prior to his departure, explaining how he felt that they had surpassed him since they debuted in 2002 with "Manatsu no Magic"; however, due to their reassurance and saying that they would all "do their best together," he had decided to stay on, putting more effort into his overall performance. Despite this, he fell into a depression, believing that he was unable to "catch up" to his friends' level and began talking about wanting to leave again.

Prior to Hiroki making his final decision, the other members, Keita Furuya, Akira Kagimoto and Shinya Tanuichi, had questioned if they should remain as a unit if Hiroki decided to leave. When Hiroki finalized his decision, with full support to the others as a group, they chose to stay together due to the constant support of their fans.

Music video
Despite music videos for "GiraGira Romantic," "Speed Star★," "Hurricane" and "Wanna Be With You" being released prior to the album, none of the videos made it to Now or Never. Instead, the new video "Stand and Fight" was performed for the album, becoming the main promotional track.

The video opens with what appears to be a rundown storage facility and the members of Lead utilizing their skills in both hip-hop street dancing and break dancing. Throughout the video, they are shown both in and around the building, each given a solo spotlight. The room is both doused in white and red light, their wardrobe changing depending on the scene. The color red was most likely chosen to symbolize strength and the willing to fight, given the color's connotations.

On January 26, 2012, the full video was uploaded to Lead's official YouTube, six months prior to the album's release in July.

Track listing

Charts

References

External links
Lead Official Site

2012 albums
Pony Canyon albums
Lead (band) albums